Pasikot, situated at Budhanilkantha Municipality, is a village in Budhanilkantha in Kathmandu District in Bagmati Province before being incorporated into the city of Budhanilkantha (along with Chapali Bhadrakali, Mahankal, Bishnu, Chunikhel and Kapan) in Nepal.  At the time of the 2011 Nepal census it had a population of 15,421.

Scenery
See the Clear Scene of Pasikot on YouTube:
Pasikot - पासिकोट - Budhanilkantha Municipality | Scene of Pasikot Village - Clear Environment

Pasikot is a beautiful village with nice view. Many people live in this village and it has a lot of good facilities. This village is like town where you can get all the facilities. It often rains and the view becomes amazing as it gets clear.

See also
 Budhanilkantha
 Budhanilkantha Temple
 Budhanilkantha School
 Shivapuri Nagarjun National Park

Notes

Populated places in Kathmandu District